Mandahasa is a 2013 Indian Kannada-language film directed by Rajesh R Nair , starring Rakesh Adiga, Nikki Das and Chethan in lead roles. The film released on 30 August 2013.

Cast

 Rakesh Adiga as Aditya
 Nikki Das as Anjali
 Chethan as Rohan
 Srinath
 Vijayasarathi 
 Alok
 Mithra
 Ashok Sharma
 Bhavya

Production

Filming 

The film began production with a principal photography on 15 December 2009.

Music

Reception

Critical response 

A critic from The Times of India scored the film at 2.5 out of 5 stars and says "While Chethan has done a splendid job as the first hero, Rakesh Adiga shows amazing talent in the climax with powerful dialogue delivery and body language. Nikki Das has done justice to her role. Srinath as heroine’s father is gracious". A critic from The New Indian Express wrote "The music by Veer Samarth is fresh. All said and done, Mandahasa is definitely a must watch with a hatke love story. The Verdict: This light-hearted musical drama is in top order". B S Srivani from Deccan Herald wrote "Many may not like the close-to-reality climax but looks like ghostly intervention in love matters is making a strong comeback after Shravana Bantu! Music and camerawork are the highlights of Mandahaasa and little else". A critic from Bangalore Mirror wrote  "Not bad, but the actors are too immature to pull it off. It would be a spoiler to reveal the only turning point in the film. But we cannot help, but say that Mandahasa is a humbler version of Shravana Bantu".

References

2010s Kannada-language films
2013 films